Vellore Airport  is located in Vellore, Tamil Nadu, India. It serves Vellore and Adjoining districts. , it is revived and under construction.

History
In July 2006, it was re-activated in as a part of Airports Authority of India idle airports activation programme to facilitate regular flying by trainee pilots of the Madras Flying Club whose operations were restricted with the increase in scheduled aircraft movement at Chennai Airport. The club stopped its training activities in March 2011.

The Government of Tamil Nadu had announced that it would speed up the construction of a terminal building and make the airport fully functional by 2009 to allow operation by 45-seater ATR aircraft. The Airports Authority of India (AAI) has embarked on an "idle airports activation programme" in the Southern region that includes Vellore. The Government plans to set up an aeronautical training institute and pilot academy in collaboration with Airports Authority of India. According to the latest news, the State Highways Department has to hand over 775 meters of land on Abdullapuram-Alangayam Road to the Airports Authority of India for completion of the airstrip at the upcoming Vellore Airport.

The airport was revived under the Regional Connectivity Scheme (RCS) of the MoCA in 2018. The AAI is planning to expand the airport by 66 acres to extend the airstrip and make it suitable for operation of a 20-seater aircraft under RCS. Currently runway and terminal building works are under progress, all the required infrastructure works was said to be ready by June 2019 for operations but the operation has failed to meet deadline and delayed many times, which has slowed the operation, the officials blame Highway Department for delay in handing over land for road space.

Layout and infrastructure

Runway

Airlines and destinations
No scheduled airline serves this airport as of March 2023.

References

External links

Airports in Tamil Nadu
Transport in Vellore
Airports with year of establishment missing